Wormhill is a civil parish in the High Peak district of Derbyshire, England.  The parish contains 26 listed buildings that are recorded in the National Heritage List for England.  Of these, three are listed at Grade II*, the middle of the three grades, and the others are at Grade II, the lowest grade.  The parish contains the village of Wormhill and the surrounding area.  Most of the listed buildings are houses, cottages and associated structures, farmhouses and farm buildings.  The other listed buildings include a church and associated structures, a village cross moved into the churchyard, a railway viaduct, and a memorial fountain.


Key

Buildings

References

Citations

Sources

 

Lists of listed buildings in Derbyshire